is a Japanese skateboarder. She won the gold at the women's park event at the World Skateboarding Championship in 2019 and, in 2021, she qualified to represent Japan at the 2020 Summer Olympics.

Biography
Okamoto was born in Takahama, Aichi. Aged 13, she won the World Skate World Park Championship in 2019, and also won another three Olympic qualifying events. In November 2019, she became the first skater to land a kickflip Indy in women's competition.

In 2021, it was announced that Okamoto had qualified for the Women's Park skateboarding competition at the 2020 Summer Olympics. She finished fourth in the event, after falling on her final run.

References

Living people
Female skateboarders
Japanese skateboarders
Skateboarders at the 2020 Summer Olympics
People from Takahama, Aichi
Olympic skateboarders of Japan
2006 births
World Skateboarding Championship medalists
21st-century Japanese women